Hermias Strauss (born 4 June 1997) is a Namibian cricketer. He made his List A debut for Namibia in the 2016–17 CSA Provincial One-Day Challenge on 15 January 2017.

References

External links
 

1997 births
Living people
Namibian cricketers
Cricketers from Windhoek